Successor may refer to:
 An entity that comes after another (see Succession (disambiguation))

Film and TV
 The Successor (film), a 1996 film including Laura Girling
 The Successor (TV program), a 2007 Israeli television program

Music
 Successor (EP), an EP by Sonata Arctica
 Successor (album), an album by Dedekind Cut

Mathematics
 A successor cardinal
 A successor ordinal
 The successor function, the primitive defined as 
 A successor (graph theory), a node following the current one in a path

Other
 The Successor (novel), a 2003 novel by Ismail Kadare
 The Diadochi, or Successors to Alexander the Great
 Successor (horse), an American Thoroughbred racehorse
 Successor, the working name for the class of British ballistic missile submarines, since renamed the Dreadnought-class
 Khalifa, a Muslim who is considered a political-religious successor to the Islamic prophet Muhammad
 Spiritual successor, a successor to a work of fiction which does not build upon the storyline established by a previous work
 "The Successor" (short story), 1951 short story by Paul Bowles

See also
 Success (disambiguation)
Legal successor (disambiguation)